Operation Sanctuary, known in Japan as  or  for short, is a Japanese adult visual novel developed by August. It was released on July 20, 2003, for Windows using the NScripter engine. The Dreamcast and PlayStation 2 versions were released by Alchemist in 2004. An anime adaptation was broadcast in Japan in 2004, and originally ran from June 30, to September 22.The title references a haiku by Yosa Buson: "Nanohana ya tsuki wa higashi ni hi wa nishi ni."

Multiple light novels based on the game have also been published. Geneon Universal has produced several drama CDs.

Plot
Naoki Kazumi is a boy whose parents died in an accident five years ago, and his memory went along with it. Since he had nowhere else to go, he lives with his cousin Matsuri Shibugaki and her parents. Every morning before school, he is awakened by his childhood friend, Honami Fujieda, who keeps telling him that he is not a child anymore, but still comes to wake him up. These usual, ordinary days seem to stretch on forever, until one day up on the school's rooftop, while Naoki is taking a peaceful nap, out of nowhere, a girl falls out of the sky. This girl, called Mikoto Amagasaki, comes from 100 years in the future, and she went back in time with the intention of finding her brother. When Mikoto sees Naoki, she mistakes him for her brother.

Characters

Main
Naoki Kuzumi

The protagonist. He lost his parents and memory in an accident five years ago. He has living with his cousin Matsuri and her parents since the accident. 
Mikoto Amagasaki

A girl who falls from the sky. Naoki thinks that her appearance in that manner was a day dream. Mikoto is from 100 years in the future and went back in time searching for her brother.
Honami Fujieda

Naoki's childhood friend. She has taken care of him since before the loss of his parents and memory.
Matsuri Shibugaki

Naoki's cousin. She is quite close to Chihiro.
Chihiro Tachibana

Matsuri's best friend and classmate. She is the lone member of the garden club.
Yui Nonohara

Naoki's homeroom teacher. The students love her in part because she is so short. Yui, like Mikoto, is from the future.
Kyouko Nishina

The school nurse. She is Yui's best friend and also comes from the future.

Supporting
Fumio Akiyama

Naoki's class representative. She is also a superintendent of the student dormitory.
Yusuke Amagasaki
Mikoto's brother who went back in time and happens to look much like Naoki.
Koji Hirose

Naoki's best friend. He plans to reform the astronomy club that Naoki belongs to.
Yuka Hirose
Koji's younger sister.
Genzou Shibugaki
Matsuri's father. He works at a trading company and is very busy. Naoki calls him "Oyaji (Dad)".
Eri Shibugaki
Matsuri's mother. She works at the same company as her husband and is likewise very busy. Naoki calls her "Eri-san".
Jun'ichi Fukano
Mathematics teacher. He is strict with his students but truly cares for their well-being.
Rei Usami
Chief director of the school. The students rarely see her. She is also from the future.

Adaptations

Printed media
A manga for Tsuki wa Higashi ni Hi wa Nishi ni, illustrated by Takeda Mika, began serialization in Dengeki G's Magazine on January 27, 2005. The manga was published by ASCII Media Works, and Dengeki Comics. Only one volume was published. An anthology comic consisting of four panel comic strips, has also been publicized, published under and issued by Majiku Comics (Enterbrain) on January 29, 2004. A novel series for Tsuki wa Higashi ni Hi wa Nishi ni was written by Okada Runa and published by Harvest. The first volume was published on March 25, 2004, and volume two and three were published on April 25, 2004, and May 25, 2004. A light novel called Tsuki wa Higashi ni Hi wa Nishi ni: Tōhonseisō School Life was published by Gakken on December 25, 2004, and written by Kano Kiichi. The light novel contains a short stories collection featuring the heroines. It was serialized in the Megami Magazine.

Drama CDs
Several drama CDs based on the game have been produced by Geneon Universal. Tsuki wa Higashi ni Hi wa Nishi ni's first drama CD was released on February 25, 2004. A second drama CD was released on April 23, 2004, entitled Tsuki wa Higashi ni Hi wa Nishi ni - Groovin' White Vacation. The first volume of another drama CD was released on October 22, 2004, the second volume was later released on November 25, 2004. The third volume was released on December 22, in the same year.

Anime
An anime adaptation was produced by Radix Ace Entertainment, and directed by Mitsuhiro Tōgō and Shousei Jinno. The anime was based on Honami scenario of PC version, and contained twelve episodes and a special episode which mainly aired on Japanese Association of Independent Television Stations between June and September 2004. Four DVDs were released between October 22 and December 12, 2004, and additional four episodes based on Mikoto scenario were contained in volume four.

Episode list

Staff

Game 
 Character design: Bekkanko
 Scenario: Taku Sakakibara, Hiroyuki Uchida, Hideaki Anzai
 Music: LOOPCUBE
 Opening: divergent flow
 Lyrics: H/de.
 Music: Hiroki
 Vocal: Mayu
 Ending: Asu no Omoide (Memories of Tomorrow)
 Lyrics: H/de.
 Music: Hiroki
 Vocal: Mayu

Anime 
 General director: Mitsuhiro Tōgō
 Director: Shouji Jinno
 Character design: Norikatsu Nakano
 General key animation director: Norikatsu Nakano
 Art director: Shinji Katahira
 Scenario: Kazuharu Satō, Tsutomu Kaneko
 Music: Akifumi Tada
 Opening: amulet
 Lyrics: a.k.a.dRESS
 Music: a.k.a.dRESS
 Vocal: Mayumi Iizuka
 Animation production: Radix

References

External links
 Visual novel website at August 
 Visual novel website at Alchemist 
 Anime official website 
 
 

2003 video games
2004 anime television series debuts
2004 manga
Anime television series based on video games
ASCII Media Works manga
Bishōjo games
Dengeki G's Magazine
Drama anime and manga
Dreamcast games
Eroge
Fantasy anime and manga
Harem anime and manga
Harem video games
Manga based on video games
NScripter games
Odex
OVAs based on video games
PlayStation 2 games
Science fiction anime and manga
Seinen manga
Video games developed in Japan
Windows games
Alchemist (company) games
August (company) games